Doryanthes excelsa, commonly known as the gymea lily, is a flowering plant in the family Doryanthaceae that is endemic to coastal areas of New South Wales near Sydney. Its common name is derived from the name given to the plant by the indigenous [Dharawal] people. The Sydney suburbs of Gymea and Gymea Bay are named after the lily.

Description
The leaves are bright green, fibrous and glabrous.

The head is surrounded by reddish-brown bracts, sometimes making it difficult to see the flowers from the ground.

Taxonomy and naming
Doryanthes excelsa was first formally described in 1802 by the Portuguese polymath, José Correia da Serra from the type specimen collected by George Bass "in mountainous parts of the colony of N.S.W.". The description was published in Transactions of the Linnean Society of London. The genus name (Doryanthes) is derived from the Ancient Greek δόρυ (dóry) meaning a "spear" and ἄνθος (ánthos) meaning "a flower". The specific epithet (excelsa) is a Latin word meaning "high", "lofty" or "distinguished".
Doryanthes excelsa and Doryanthes palmeri are the only two members of the family Doryanthaceae.

"Doryanthes" has inspired the naming of the journal of history and heritage for Southern Sydney founded by Dharawal historian Les Bursill.

Distribution and habitat
Doryanthes excelsa occurs in woodland and dry sclerophyll forest in coastal areas and adjacent mountains from Karuah to Mount Keira. It usually grows in soils derived from sandstone.

Uses

Indigenous use
Aboriginal people roasted the young stems of gymea lily for eating. They also roasted the roots to make a kind of cake. Fibres from the leaves were used for making brushes and matting.

Horticulture
Gymea lilies are hardy and adaptable plants often used in landscape gardening, not only in the Sydney region but also in other coastal areas such as Brisbane and Perth. Plants can be grown from seed but may not flower for up to eight years. Flowering can be encouraged by fire and by carefully placing a stone in the centre of the rosette.

Image gallery

See also

 List of plants known as lily

References

External links
Doryanthes excelsa Occurrence data from Australasian Virtual Herbarium

Doryanthaceae
Flora of New South Wales
Endemic flora of Australia
Asparagales of Australia
Garden plants of Australia
Drought-tolerant plants
Plants described in 1802